Diana Luna (born 3 September 1982) is a professional golfer from Italy.

Luna was born in Rome, Italy and turned professional in 2001. She won her first event on the Ladies European Tour in 2004 at the Tenerife Ladies Open, beating Becky Brewerton down the stretch.

After winless years in 2005-2008, Luna won two events back-to-back in the summer of 2009 for her second and third wins. Those two wins gave Luna a spot on the 2009 Solheim Cup European team.

Luna won the 2011 Unicredit Ladies German Open with a score of 264, 24-under-par. She played all four rounds without any bogies and create a new record for woman in golf history.

At the 2018 Mediterranean Games, Luna won a silver medal in the women's team competition.

Luna won the Ladies Italian PGAI Championship eleven times: 2002, 2004, 2006, 2011, 2012, 2013, 2014, 2015, 2016, 2019, 2021.

Ladies European Tour wins (5)
2004 Tenerife Ladies Open
2009 AIB Ladies Irish Open, SAS Ladies Masters
2011 Unicredit Ladies German Open, Deutsche Bank Ladies Swiss Open

Team appearances
Amateur
European Ladies' Team Championship (representing Italy): 2001

Professional
World Cup (representing Italy): 2005, 2008
Solheim Cup (representing Europe): 2009
European Championships (representing Italy): 2018

References

External links
 

Italian female golfers
Ladies European Tour golfers
Solheim Cup competitors for Europe
Mediterranean Games silver medalists for Italy
Mediterranean Games medalists in golf
Competitors at the 2018 Mediterranean Games
Sportspeople from Rome
1982 births
Living people